Billigheim-Ingenheim is a municipality in the Südliche Weinstraße district, in Rhineland-Palatinate, Germany. It consists of four districts: Billigheim, Ingenheim, Appenhofen, and Mühlhofen.

Photo gallery

References

Municipalities in Rhineland-Palatinate
Südliche Weinstraße